Kismat  is a 1968 Indian Hindi-language film directed by Manmohan Desai, produced by Kamal Mehra and released under the banner of Pride of Asia Films. It stars Biswajeet, Babita, Helen and Kamal Mehra in prominent roles. Other notable actors in the film are Bhagwan Sinha, Murad, M. B. Shetty (father of Rohit Shetty), Hari Shivdasani, Hiralal, Indra Kumar, Jagdish Raj (as Jagdishraj), Polsan, Prem Kumar, Paul Sharma, Tun Tun and Ullhas.

It can be categorised as a romantic family thriller film. It was shot in 14 reels, using 35 mm film format in Eastman Color.

The film has been noted mainly for the soundtrack given by O.P. Nayyar, which included three songs that became very popular – "Aao Huzoor Tum Ko", "Kajra Mohabbat Wala" and "Aankhon Mein Qayamat". Biswajeet is one of the first heroes in Bollywood to be dressed as a woman on screen for the song Kajra Mohabbat Wala.

This film was the last collaboration between singer Shamshad Begum and music director O.P. Nayyar. They never worked together again. Shamshad Begum recorded her last song for O.P. Nayyar, "Kajra Mohabbat Wala" along with Asha Bhosle in this film.

Plot 
The nation is struck by a series of bomb blasts spread across the country. The Commissioner of Police is baffled as to who is behind these attacks. The Commissioner receives an anonymous call where the caller says that he knows who the masterminds behind the blasts are and their associates. He also says that he would like to help the Police. The informant then says that he has stored the names and images of mastermind and their associates in a microdot. The informant here is the Mr. Gonz, owner of the store 'Twist Musical & PhotoShop'. The main mastermind or the villain is Scorpion. He learns that the informant is about to give their organisation's information to the police. Scorpion then sends his men or goons to recover the microdot.

As soon as the goons enter the shop and threaten the informant to give the microdot, the hero Vicky enters the store to get his guitar. The informant slips the microdot into Vicky's guitar and Vicky leaves. The goons realise this and follow Vicky. Vicky is a singer and guitar player at a local nightclub. He along with Nancy entertain the crowds. After the night show, Vicky and Nancy head to Vicky's room. Here they encounter Mr. Gonz who is badly injured. Meanwhile, the goons follow Vicky to his room and kill Mr. Gonz. They try to take the guitar (his father's gift) containing the microdot from him, but Vicky escapes with the guitar. He is on the run and tries to convince the police that Mr. Gonz has been killed, but is unable to do so. He again encounters the goons. This time he escapes from them and boards a train. Here he meets Roma who has also run away (from her home) due to the strict rules enforced by her rich and wealthy father.

During the train journey, Vicky and Roma become friendly. The goons follow Vicky and try to attack them on the train. Vicky and Roma manage to escape from the train. They are in the middle of nowhere and start heading towards the nearest town. On their way to the town, they encounter Jani Bhai, an inventor, who gives them a ride to the town, with his customised car. Jani and Vicky become best of friends and Jani gets Vicky a job as a guitarist/singer in the hotel by portraying him as a famous singer. Incidentally, Roma is staying in the same hotel. Vicky and Roma fall in love. Scorpion learns that Vicky is staying in the hotel through his henchmen, Julie, present as an employee in the hotel. Meanwhile, Nancy comes to this hotel and creates a misunderstanding between Vicky and Roma. Roma dumps Vicky and Nancy takes Vicky to her room. Nancy plots to kill Vicky but in the process, gets herself killed accidentally. While dying, she tells Vicky that Scorpion had sent her and she was compelled to kill because her parents were held hostage. The rest of the film deals with who Scorpion is and whether Vicky and Roma get together.

Cast 
 Biswajeet as Vicky
 Babita as Roma
 Helen as Nancy
 Murad as Commissioner of Police
 Jani Bhai, an eccentric inventor
 Hari Shivdasani, chief of the Scorpion Organisation
 Hiralal as Lopez
 M. B. Shetty as Joe
 Bhagwan Sinha as Gonz, owner of 'Twist Musical & PhotoShop' an informant to the police
 Yee Chang as Chang, an enemy agent and most wanted man by many countries

Production

Filming 
For the filming of the song "Kajra Mohabbat Wale", the hero Biswajeet had to be dressed up as a girl and the heroine Babita as a Pathan. Biswajeet in an interview, said this about the preparation that went about making the song, "Kajra Mohabbat Wale":

Release

Home media 
The film has been released in the following distribution formats:VCD and recently as DVD.

Reception 
The music by O.P. Nayyar was well received with three popular and memorable songs.

Box office 
The film was declared an average film in the box office verdicts. It could be attributed to the story and the earnings it made (Net of INR  70,00,000 vs Gross of INR  1,40,00,000).

Controversies 
The song "Kajra Mohabbat Wala" became very popular due to the way it was filmed, choreographed and for its memorable tune. Biswajeet did the drag act of putting a female disguise for this song. Film historian and critic, Firoze Rangoonwalla explains the controversy that took place after the film was released:

Soundtrack 
The music of the film was composed by O.P. Nayyar. Notable tracks are "Aankhon Mein Qayamat Ke Kajal" sung by Mahendra Kapoor, "Aao Huzoor Tum Ko" sung by Asha Bhosle and "Kajra Mohabbat Wala" sung by Asha Bhosle and Shamshad Begum.

Track listing 
Originally, the film consisted of 6 soundtracks (mainly for the cassette and gramophone version).

Additional tracks 
In mid-2000, two additional tracks were added known as revival versions for "Aao Huzoor Tum Ko" and "Kajra Mohabbat Wala" songs. The CD and iTunes versions of the film now contain 8 tracks.

Vinyl or gramophone record track Info 
The Gramophone record consists of two sides having the following tracks:

Side 1

Side 2

Songs remixed 
The tracks that have been remixed the most are:
 "Aao Huzoor Tumko"
 "Kajra Mohabbat Wala"
Both these songs are sung by female singers and most notable, Asha Bhosle features in both of them.

The track "Aao Huzoor Tumko" has been remixed a number of times. Following is a list of notable films and music albums it was used in:
 "Punjab", a song in the Global Spirit, a 2003 album by Karunesh S
 Double Cross – Ek Dhoka, a 2005 film
  Non-Stop Love Shots, a 2005 album
 Salaam-e-Ishq, a 2007 Hindi film, as a small song clip (played between in the scene where it's Anil Kapoor's birthday and he sees Anjali)

Songs reused 
The track, "Kajra Mohabbat Wala", has been used as a non-remixed song in the 2011 Hindi movie, Tanu Weds Manu. The song has been used as a marriage celebration or ritual song. The song has been portrayed by Kangana Ranaut. The song rights have been obtained from HMV.

See also 
Bollywood films of 1968

References

External links 
 Kismat at the Internet Movie Database
 Kismat (1968) Songs at iTunes

1968 films
Films directed by Manmohan Desai
1960s Hindi-language films
Films scored by O. P. Nayyar
Films set in hotels